Marshall Kent (born September 21, 1992) is an American ten-pin bowler from Yakima, Washington who currently competes on the PBA Tour and World Bowling Tour. He has been a member of Junior Team USA, and is a six-time and current member of Team USA. He has won five PBA Tour titles and five PBA Regional titles.

After 8 years as a member of the Storm Bowling pro staff, Kent accepted a sponsorship agreement with BIG Bowling in 2021. He is also sponsored by Turbo Grips, Dexter shoes and Apparel EFX.

Amateur career
Kent was a three-time member of Junior Team USA, and has been a Team USA member since 2012. He was a two-time Collegiate Player of the Year (2011-12 and 2012-13) bowling for Robert Morris University in Chicago, Illinois, where he also earned a degree in Business Administration.

Kent won a gold medal in trios at the 2011 PABCON Youth Championships, and was the 2012 Russian Open Champion. He won two gold medals (singles and team) in the 2012 World Youth Championships, and a team gold medal in the 2012 PABCON Championships.

Kent won the  2014 Brunswick Euro Challenge as an amateur, and thus his win did not qualify for a PBA title.

Professional bowling career
Shortly after his Brunswick Euro Challenge win in March 2014, Kent joined the Professional Bowlers Association. He was named the 2014 Harry Golden PBA Rookie of the Year, having won the Kingdom International Open for his first PBA Tour title. He picked up his second win at the PBA Team Challenge in 2016.

2017 was Kent's first year with multiple PBA Tour wins, as he won his first two singles titles on US soil. He finished the season fourth in PBA earnings, with a career-best $112,480. To date (2021 season end), he has over $500,000 in career PBA earnings and 17 career 300 games in PBA competition.

Despite a career-high five championship round appearances, Kent failed to win a title in the 2018 PBA Tour season. He did win the non-title season-ending PBA Clash event on December 23.

Kent won his fifth PBA Tour title on March 6, 2022 in the Roth-Holman Doubles Championship, as he and partner E. J. Tackett climbed the ladder from the #4 seed.

In addition to his five standard PBA Tour wins, Kent has five PBA Regional Tour titles and a runner-up finish at the 2016 U.S. Open.

PBA Tour titles
2014: Kingdom International Open (Riyadh, Saudi Arabia)
2016: PBA Team Challenge (with 'Merica Rooster Illusion team) (Las Vegas, NV)
2017: Xtra Frame Lubbock Sports Open (Lubbock, TX)
2017: Grand Casino Hotel & Resort PBA Oklahoma Open (Shawnee, OK)
2022: PBA WSOB XIII Roth-Holman Doubles Championship w/E. J. Tackett (Wauwatosa, WI)

PBA Tour non-title wins
2018 PBA Clash

Career statistics

Statistics are through the last complete PBA season.

+CRA = Championship Round Appearances

Personal
From 2013 to early 2018, Marshall dated PWBA bowler Danielle McEwan. The two initially met when both were members of Junior Team USA, but did not officially become a couple until representing Team USA at an event in Bangkok, Thailand. After almost five years of dating, McEwan and Kent went their separate ways for unspecified personal reasons.

Originally from Yakima, Washington, Kent relocated to Las Vegas, Nevada in 2019.

References

External links
 Kent's Profile at PBA.com
 Kent's "Bowler" page on Facebook

American ten-pin bowling players
People from Yakima, Washington
1992 births
Living people